Artigas Boulevard is a boulevard in Montevideo, Uruguay. It runs from the Rambla at Punta Carretas to the Rambla at Capurro-Bella Vista, going north for about 6.5 kilometers and turning 100° west. It is an important connection road, linking the central barrios of the city, with access to different national routes.

History 
After the Uruguayan Civil War, the city began a strong expansion, so the authorities looked for a way to organize the growth of what was called the "Ciudad Nueva" ("new city") −area outside the old city, which began to develop after the demolition of the fortifications−; the avenue delimited it, that is why it turns 100° to the west. Because of this, in 1878 the layout of a boulevard was approved, which gave rise to the Novísima Ciudad (Most New City). At first it was called "Circunvalación Boulevard", but in 1885 it was named "General José Artigas Boulevard", after the national hero.
On its way, it crosses or borders 16 barrios of Montevideo. It intersects some of the main avenues of the city, like Avenida Agraciada, Avenida General Flores, Avenida 8 de Octubre, and the Rambla of Montevideo, all of which connect to main roads linking Montevideo with the other cities of Uruguay.

Landmarks 
The main landmarks along this boulevard are:

 Italian Hospital of Montevideo
 Democracy Square
 Obelisk of Montevideo
 Parva Domus Palace

Gallery

References

External links 

Streets in Montevideo
Boulevards
José Gervasio Artigas
Parque Rodó, Montevideo
Punta Carretas
Cordón, Montevideo
Tres Cruces
Larrañaga, Montevideo
Brazo Oriental
Atahualpa, Montevideo
Prado, Montevideo
Capurro